Nico Rohmann (born 23 November 1952) is a Luxembourger former footballer who played at both professional and international levels as a defender.

Career
Rohmann played club football in Luxembourg, Belgium and the United States for US Rumelange, Charleroi, Jeunesse Esch and the San Diego Sockers.

He also earned 24 caps for the Luxembourg national team between 1977 and 1985, appearing in 10 FIFA World Cup qualifying matches in the process.

References

1952 births
Living people
Luxembourgian footballers
Luxembourg international footballers
Luxembourgian expatriate footballers
Expatriate footballers in Belgium
Luxembourgian expatriate sportspeople in Belgium
Expatriate soccer players in the United States
Luxembourgian expatriate sportspeople in the United States
San Diego Sockers (NASL) players
San Diego Sockers (original MISL) players
North American Soccer League (1968–1984) players
North American Soccer League (1968–1984) indoor players
Major Indoor Soccer League (1978–1992) players
Association football defenders
US Rumelange players
Jeunesse Esch players
R. Charleroi S.C. players
Belgian Pro League players